Romeo Mitrović (born 12 July 1979) is a Bosnian retired football goalkeeper.

Club career
During the time spent in FK Sloboda Tuzla and HŠK Zrinjski Mostar, he proved himself as goalkeeper, and played in HŠK Zrinjski Mostar.

In June 2008, he came from HŠK Zrinjski Mostar to Kecskeméti TE, and in 2010 Mitrović moved from Kecskeméti TE to Nybergsund IL-Trysil in the Norwegian Adeccoliga. In January 2012 he joined Dinamo Zagreb, but in June 2013 he left the club, making only a single appearance in a cup match against lower league side NK Vrsar. His career ended when he was banned for punching a referee, while playing for Branitelj in 2014.

International career
He made his debut for Bosnia and Herzegovina in a June 2001 Merdeka Tournament match away against Slovakia and has earned a total of 6 caps , scoring no goals. Two of his games at the Merdeka were unofficial, though. His final international was a May 2006 friendly match away against Iran.

References

External links
 
 Profile - GNK Dinamo

1979 births
Living people
Sportspeople from Tuzla
Association football goalkeepers
Bosnia and Herzegovina footballers
Bosnia and Herzegovina international footballers
FK Sloboda Tuzla players
NK Osijek players
HŠK Zrinjski Mostar players
Kecskeméti TE players
Nybergsund IL players
NK Lokomotiva Zagreb players
GNK Dinamo Zagreb players
NK Bratstvo Gračanica players
Premier League of Bosnia and Herzegovina players
Croatian Football League players
Nemzeti Bajnokság I players
Norwegian First Division players
First League of the Federation of Bosnia and Herzegovina players
Bosnia and Herzegovina expatriate footballers
Expatriate footballers in Croatia
Bosnia and Herzegovina expatriate sportspeople in Croatia
Expatriate footballers in Hungary
Bosnia and Herzegovina expatriate sportspeople in Hungary
Expatriate footballers in Norway
Bosnia and Herzegovina expatriate sportspeople in Norway